Buika is a surname. Notable people with the surname include:

 Concha Buika (born 1972), Equatoguinean-Spanish singer
 Buika (album), album by Concha Buika
 Virginia Buika (born 1986), Afro-Spanish musician, actress, director, and producer